Simon Sherry-Wood (born November 7, 1984) is an Irish-born American television personality and model. He is best known for his appearances on The Real World and RuPaul's Drag Race.

Career
Sherry-Wood started his career on a reality television series Real World. He was a cast member of The Real World: Paris in 2003.

He later became a cast member of RuPaul's Drag Race as a pit crew member.

Personal life
Born in Dublin, Ireland, Sherry-Wood emigrated to the United States in his early 20s, and became a naturalized American citizen in 2020.

Filmography

References

External links
 
 

1984 births
Living people
LGBT models
The Real World (TV series) cast members